Ardonis thaumasta is a moth in the family Geometridae. It is found on Java.

References

Moths described in 1935
Eupitheciini
Moths of Indonesia